The 1917 All-Western college football team consists of American football players selected to the All-Western teams chosen by various selectors for the 1917 college football season.

All-Western selections

Ends
 Charles Bolen, Ohio State (FM, HP, LA, LGS, PD)
 W. M. Kelley, Wisconsin (FM, GWA, LA, LGS, PD)
 Charles Laun, Iowa (GWA)
 Alan Boyd, Michigan (HP)
 John Rasmussen, Camp Grant / Nebraska (REAL)
 Gardiner, Camp Custer / Carlisle Indian (REAL)

Tackles
 George Hauser, Minnesota (FM, HB, GWA, LA, LGS, PD)
 Harold J. Courtney, Ohio State (LA, LGS, PD [guard])
 Dave Philbin, Notre Dame (GWA)
 Ernest Hubka, Nebraska (HP)
 Hugh Blacklock, Great Lakes Naval Training Station / Michigan (REAL)
 Ward, Camp Custer (REAL)

Guards
 Charles Higgins, Chicago (FM, GWA, LA, PD)
 Elmert T. Rundquist, Illinois (FM [tackle], LA, LGS)
 Conrad L. Eklund, Minnesota (GWA, LGS, PD [tackle])
 John Ulrich, Northwestern (FM)
 Tillie Voss, Detroit (HP)
 Joseph Hanish, Michigan (HP)
 Whiting, Camp Grant – Chicago (REAL)
 Robins, Great Lakes Naval Training Station / Springfield Normal (REAL)

Centers
 Frank Rydzewski, Notre Dame (FM, GWA, LA, LGS, PD)
 Frank Culver, Michigan (HP)
 Pottinger, Great Lakes Naval Training Station – Wisconsin (REAL)

Quarterbacks
 Archie Weston, Michigan (FM, LA [halfback], LGS)
 Eber Simpson, Wisconsin (LA, PD)
 Howard Yerges, Sr., Ohio State (GWA)
 Harry Costello, Camp Custer / Georgetown (REAL)

Halfbacks
 Chic Harley, Ohio State (FM, GWA, HP, LA, LGS) (CFHOF)
 Joe Brandy, Notre Dame (FM)
 Hugo Otopalik, Nebraska (LGS)
 Eber Simpson, Wisconsin (GWA)
 Allen, Detroit (HP)
 Fritz Shiverick, Camp Grant / Cornell (REAL)
 James B. Craig, Fort Sheridan / Michigan (REAL)

Fullbacks
 Bob Koehler, Northwestern (FM, GWA, LA, LGS)
 Forrest Strome, Kalamazoo (HP)
 Cedric C. Smith, Great Lakes Naval Training Station / Michigan (REAL)

Key

 Bold = consensus choice by a majority of the selectors
 FM = Frank G. Menke, sporting editor of Newspaper Feature Service
 GWA = G. W. Axelson in Chicago Herald
 HP = Howard Pearson in Detroit Journal
 LA = Leonard Adams, football editor Chicago Journal
 LGS = Lambert G. Sullivan, football editor of Chicago Daily News
 PD = Paddy Driscoll in Chicago Examiner
 REAL = The Real All-Western Eleven (by Lambert G. Sullivan, football editor Chicago Daily News)
 CFHOF = College Football Hall of Fame

See also
1917 College Football All-America Team
1917 All-Big Ten Conference football team

References

1917 Big Ten Conference football season
All-Western college football teams